Yezhovka is a rural locality (a khutor) in Ryabovskoye Rural Settlement, Alexeyevsky District, Volgograd Oblast, Russia. The population was 160 as of 2010.

Geography 
Yezhovka is located on the Malaya Peskovatka River, 73 km southwest of Alexeyevskaya (the district's administrative centre) by road. Ryabovsky is the nearest rural locality.

References 

Rural localities in Alexeyevsky District, Volgograd Oblast